Gerald Wilson Oliver Smith (June 26, 1892 – May 28, 1974) was an English-born actor who spent most of his career in the United States, both in New York City as a stage actor and in the Hollywood film industry.

Born in Sidcup, Kent, England, Smith debuted as a music hall singer in London. He came to the United States as part of a London Gaiety Company production of To-night's the Night. His Broadway career began in 1916, and he appeared in, among other productions, three George Gershwin musicals: Lady Be Good (1924), Oh, Kay! (1928) and Pardon My English (1933). He also had bit parts in silent films, such as The Mysterious Miss Terry (1917), and went on to appear in talkies and musicals in the 1930s and 1940s. He began working in Hollywood in 1937, and was frequently typecast as a genteel butler or pompous English gentleman. His film appearances included Casablanca, National Velvet, and One Hundred Men and a Girl. Smith appeared in more than one hundred movies, often in small roles, and was not always mentioned in the credits. From 1952 to 1956 he made several television appearances. He retired to the Motion Picture & Television Country House and Hospital late in life.

Death
On May 28, 1974, Smith died in Woodland Hills, California, at age 81. He is buried at Pierce Brothers Valhalla Memorial Park, North Hollywood, Los Angeles.

Filmography

The Mysterious Miss Terry (1917) as John Quig (film debut)
School for Wives (1925) as Ronald Van Stuyvesant
The Strange Case (1931, Short)
Kissing Time (1933, Short) as Ferdie
His Double Life (1933) as (uncredited)
They're Off (1936, Short) as Race Track Man
The Man I Marry (1936) as Throckton Van Cortland
Girl Overboard (1937) as Harvey
When You're in Love (1937) as Gerald Meeker
Top of the Town (1937) as Borden Executive
The Lady Escapes (1937) as Reggie Farnworth
The Big Boodle (1937) as Butler (uncredited)
One Hundred Men and a Girl (1937) as Stevens
Behind the Mike (1937) as Robert Ainesley
The Lady Fights Back (1937) as Sir Daniel McAndrews
Fight for Your Lady (1937) as 1st Creditor (uncredited)
Crashing Hollywood (1938) as Joe, Mike's Butler (uncredited)
Invisible Enemy (1938) as Bassett
Blond Cheat (1938) - Bankers as Mike's Butler (uncredited)
Gateway (1938) as Englishman
Vacation from Love (1938) as Skewes, the Butler (uncredited)
The Law West of Tombstone (1938) as Delmonico Maitre d' (uncredited)
Three Smart Girls Grow Up (1939) as Guest (uncredited)
The Kid from Texas (1939) as Noel - Bertie's Butler (uncredited)
Bridal Suite (1939) as Purser (uncredited)
Bachelor Mother (1939) as Hennessy (uncredited)
Pride and Prejudice (1940) as Col. Fitzwilliam (uncredited)
Dulcy (1940) - Huggins as the Butler (uncredited)
Kiddie Kure (1940, Short) as Evans, the Butler
You're the One (1941) as Hotel Clerk
Federal Fugitives (1941) as Hobbs - Lane's Butler
The Singing Hill (1941) as Dada the Butler
Puddin' Head (1941) as Hudson - Butler
Mrs. Miniver (1942) as Car Dealer (uncredited)
Beyond the Blue Horizon (1942) as Chadwick
Tish (1942) as Parkins (uncredited)
Casablanca (1942) as Pickpocketed Englishman (uncredited)
Forever and a Day (1943) as Man in Air Raid Shelter
Thumbs Up (1943) as Hopeless Orchestra Leader (uncredited)
Heaven Can Wait (1943) as Smith - Van Cleve's Second Butler (uncredited)
Jane Eyre (1943) as Footman at Gateshead (uncredited)
Knickerbocker Holiday (1944) as English Colonist (uncredited)
Casanova Brown (1944) as Chauffeur (uncredited)
Mrs. Parkington (1944) as Taylor
National Velvet (1944) as Photographer
The Man in Half Moon Street (1945) as Pharmacy Clerk (uncredited)
Sunbonnet Sue (1945) as Masters
The Sailor Takes a Wife (1945) as Gerald - Freddie's Butler
Rainbow Over Texas (1946) as Larkin the Butler
The Verdict (1946) as Artist (uncredited)
Moss Rose (1947) as Hotel Desk Clerk (uncredited)
Singapore (1947) as Englishman (uncredited)
Linda, Be Good (1947) as Butler
Her Husband's Affairs (1947) as Harold - Winterbottom's Butler (uncredited)
Enchantment (1948) as Willoughby
That Forsyte Woman (1949) as Wilson
Belle of Old Mexico (1950) as Matthews (uncredited)
Lullaby of Broadway (1951) as Salesman at Fur Shop (uncredited)
As Young as You Feel (1951) as McKinleys' Butler (uncredited)
Dick Turpin's Ride (1951) as Burfrey (uncredited)
Adventures of Wild Bill Hickok (1952, TV) as Equerry 
Lady in the Iron Mask (1952) (uncredited)
Captain Pirate (1952) as Heatherstone (uncredited)
Sword of Venus (1953) as Sir Norman Blandish (final film) (uncredited)
My Little Margie (1955, TV) as Blivens, the Butler 
The 20th Century-Fox Hour (1955-1956) as Wilson/Bates
The Barbara Stanwyck Show (1960, TV) (final appearance)

References

External links
 
 
 
 
 

1892 births
1974 deaths
English male actors
Male actors from London
British expatriate male actors in the United States